Inderøya is a peninsula in the Trondheimsfjord in Trøndelag county, Norway.  The peninsula constitutes the northern (more populated) part of the municipality of Inderøy (which is named after the peninsula). The peninsula borders the Beitstadfjorden to the north, the Børgin fjord to the east, the Skarnsund strait to the west, and the Trondheimsfjord to the south. It is connected to the mainland via a narrow strip of land to the northeast.

Until 2011, the municipality of Inderøy covered the peninsula in addition to the Røra area, but since 2012, Inderøy has also included Mosvik, a larger peninsula on the west side of Skarnsund.

References

Inderøy
Peninsulas of Trøndelag